Ariza is a municipality in the province of Zaragoza, Aragon, Spain. It is located in the Almazán basin, near the western boundary of Aragon, 142 km from Zaragoza.

Ariza is located 763 metres above sea level on the left bank of the Jalón river, is the city gate of Castile, which was long in dispute between Castile and Aragon.

The population is 1267 inhabitants, although it increases in summer and holidays due to  tourism.

References 

Municipalities in the Province of Zaragoza